Tomah station is an Amtrak intercity train station in Tomah, Wisconsin, served by Amtrak's daily Empire Builder. The station house is a wooden structure that was originally built by the Chicago, Milwaukee, St. Paul and Pacific Railroad. It is not a staffed station, but a caretaker opens and closes the waiting room, which occupies a corner of the original station structure.

Statistics

References

External links

Tomah Amtrak Station (USA Rail Guide -- Train Web)

Amtrak stations in Wisconsin
Buildings and structures in Monroe County, Wisconsin
Former Chicago, Milwaukee, St. Paul and Pacific Railroad stations